Yang Guang (born 11 May 1984) is a Chinese ski jumper who competed in the Ski jumping (large hill team) event at the 2006 Winter Olympics.

References

1984 births
Living people
Ski jumpers at the 2006 Winter Olympics
Olympic ski jumpers of China
Skiers from Jilin
Chinese male ski jumpers
People from Tonghua
Ski jumpers at the 2011 Asian Winter Games
Ski jumpers at the 2017 Asian Winter Games